The Dallara F188 was a Formula One car designed by Gian Paolo Dallara and Sergio Rinland for use by the BMS Scuderia Italia team during the 1988 Formula One season. Driven by Italian Alex Caffi, it failed to score any points for the team.

Development
Dallara was contracted by Beppe Lucchini to design a car for his new BMS Scuderia Italia racing team, which was to participate in the 1988 Formula One season. The F188, powered by a Cosworth DFZ V8 engine, was designed by Gian Paolo Dallara in conjunction with Sergio Rinland. With the longest wheelbase of all the Formula One cars entered for 1988, the F188 was a well-regarded car given the resources available to Dallara. A total of three chassis were built during the year.

Race history
Scuderia Italia ran a single entry through 1988 for Italian Alex Caffi. The F188 was not quite ready to start the season and a F3000 chassis, the Dallara 3087, was used for the opening race in Brazil. Caffi debuted the F188 at San Marino where he qualified in 24th but retired from the race itself. He put in a creditable performance throughout the year and qualified for all but one race with the F188, with a best of 10th in Hungary. No points finishes were scored, but Caffi did manage a best placing of seventh, at the Portuguese Grand Prix.

Complete Formula One results
(key) (results in bold indicate pole position; results in italics indicate fastest lap)

Notes

References

1988 Formula One season cars
Dallara Formula One cars